Peoga is an unincorporated community in Brown and Johnson counties, in the U.S. state of Indiana.

History
A post office was established at Peoga in 1898, and remained in operation until it was discontinued in 1903. According to one source, Peoga is believed to be derived from an Indian word meaning "village".

Geography

References

External links

Unincorporated communities in Brown County, Indiana
Unincorporated communities in Johnson County, Indiana
Unincorporated communities in Indiana
Indianapolis metropolitan area
1898 establishments in Indiana